Epithelioid cell histiocytoma is a rare skin condition that is considered to be a variant of a dermatofibroma.

See also 
 Pleomorphic lipoma
 List of cutaneous conditions

References 

Dermal and subcutaneous growths